Sowerby-under-Cotcliffe is a civil parish in the Hambleton District of North Yorkshire, England. The population at the 2011 Census was less than 100. Details are included in the civil parish of Winton, Stank and Hallikeld. The Cod Beck river flows to the east of the parish forming a border with KIrby Sigston and Landmoth-cum-Catto civil parishes.

In 2011, North Yorkshire County Council estimated the population to be 40, which had dropped to 30 by a 2015 estimate. The name is a combination of the Old Norse Saurbi meaning swampy farmstead, and koteclyf, meaning Bank by the cottage.

At the turn of the 19th century, a Roman Road was uncovered when building work was being undertaken to build a new road. The  route went from Barmby to Stamford Bridge, Thirsk and then onto Durham.

Governance 
Historically the area was within the wapentake of Allertonshire, and during the 13th century, the land was owned by the Bishop of Durham. It is now in North Yorkshire and is represented at Parliament by the Richmond Constituency.

References 

Civil parishes in North Yorkshire